Occasions or circumstances of revelation (asbāb al-nuzūl) names the historical context in which Quranic verses were revealed from the perspective of traditional Islam. Though of some use in reconstructing the Qur'an's historicity, asbāb is by nature an exegetical rather than a historiographical genre, and as such usually associates the verses it explicates with general situations rather than specific events. The study of asbāb al-nuzūl is part of the study of Tafsir (interpretation of the Qur'an).

Etymology 

Asbāb أَسْبَابْ is the plural of the Arabic word sabab سَبَبْ, which means "cause", "reason", or "occasion", and nuzūl نُزُولْ is the verbal noun of the verb root nzl ن ز ل, literally meaning "to descend" or "to send down", and thus (metaphorically) "to reveal", referring God (Allah) sending down a revelation to his prophets.

Though technical terms within Qur'anic exegesis often have their origins in the book itself (e.g. naskh), sabab/asbāb does not: Despite the appearance of the stem sbb over 11 times Quran (Q.2:166, Q.18:84, Q.18:85 Q.18:89, Q.22:15, Q.38:10, Q.40:36-37), none of the verses seem the least bit connected to a statement concerning the occasions of revelation.

Within exegetical literature, the use of sabab in a technical sense did not occur until relatively late: the material which would be later called by asbāb writers used alternate phraseologies to introduce their reports, such as al-āya nazalat fī hādhā- "the verse was revealed about such and such"- or fa-anzala allāh- "so God revealed/sent down".  The term "sabab" in its technical sense (meaning "occasion of revelation") seems to begin to make its appearance in the works of Tabari (d. 922 CE) and al-Nahhas (d. 950 CE). Al-Jassas (d. 981) was the first to use the term regularly in introducing reports about the revelation of the Quran.

Origin 
Modern scholarship has long posited an origin for the sabab al-nuzūl based largely on its function within exegesis. William Montgomery Watt, for example, stressed the narratological significance of these types of reports: "The Quranic allusions had to be elaborated into complete stories and the background filled in if the main ideas were to be impressed on the minds of simple men." John Wansbrough, on the other hand, noted their juridical function, particularly with regard to establishing a chronology of revelation for the purposes of such mechanisms as naskh. Rippin in turn rejected this, arguing that the sababs primary function is in haggadic/qissaic exegesis, and that this in turn hints at its origin:

One thing common to all these theories is the assumption that the sabab is built around the Qur'ānic verse(s) embedded in it. In his extensive survey of early Muslim traditions regarding Muhammad, Rubin upends this consensus (while preserving Rippin's speculation about the ultimately qassaic/story-teller origins of these reports) by arguing that most asbāb originally started as prophetic biographical material into which Qur'anic verses were only later inserted:

Rubin bases that conclusion partly upon the very stereotyped way in which "linking words" are used to introduce Qur'anic verse into a report. Mostly, though, he relies upon the existence of multiple parallel non-Qur'anic forms of the narrative for most asbāb.  By assuming that a report's link to scripture would not be removed once established, the non-Qur'anic (and thus non-exegetic) version of the report is in fact the original one. Rippin takes issue with this last assumption, though, by arguing that the evidence does not preclude the creation of parallel sīra narratives even after the circulation of a supposedly "authoritative" Qur'anic one.

 Outline and function 
The Quran was revealed over a period of nearly twenty three years. Muslim scholars agree that the revelations of the Quran can be divided into two broad types: One type includes passages of the Quran which were revealed in response to specific events, incidents or questions put forward to Muhammad. The second type includes passages of the Quran which were not direct responses to any historical or social development in the life of the Muslim community. A thorough understanding of the first type of passages, therefore, depend on knowing the circumstances of the events which occasioned them. Such knowledge is an important tool for explaining the meanings of this type of Quranic verses.

One function of the sabab report is theological.  As Rippin notes:

The occasion of revelation's primary function, though, is exegetical, and by enumerating its various uses within Qur'anic interpretation we visit nearly all the problems of concern for classical Muslim exegetes.  These problems span the hermeneutical spectrum, from the most basic units of linguistic meaning to such technical intellectual disciplines as law and philosophy and all points in between.  A major underlying difficulty encountered at all levels is the Qur'an's lack of structure.  This extends beyond the question of temporal ordering to one of basic unity of thought and expression:

The various levels of interpretation along with their typical problems are listed below in order of increasing hermeneutical complexity:

 Lexical: What is the meaning of a particular word?
 Intra-Versal/Sentential: Who or what is the referent of a particular pronoun?
 Inter-Versal/Pericopal: What is the relation between verses?  Do they constitute a single meaning/unit of thought, or are they distinct?
 Narratological ("Qissaic"): What is the story being told? Why do the characters in it react in the way they do?
 Historical/Ethnological: What events or personages are being described?  What cultural practices are being reported and how do they relate the jāhilī scene?
 Legal ("Hukmic"): What are the legal implications of a particular verse and how do these relate to the remaining corpus of Islamic holy law?  Is the ruling limited in scope to the circumstances or even unique instant in which it was revealed, or does it define a general principle with broad applicability?

A detailed examination of the function of asbāb at several of these levels follows.  Unless otherwise noted examples all come from Rippin's The function of asbāb al-nuzūl in Qur'ānic exegesis (BSOAS 51). Quotations from the Qur'an are taken from the Abdullah Yusuf `Ali translation.

 Lexical/sentential 

A demonstration of the two lowest-level functions of the sabab may be seen in the exegesis of verse 2:44 :

A sabab put forward by both al-Wāhidī (Kitāb 22) and al-Suyūtī (Lubāb 19) claim this verse was revealed about those Jews of Medina who urged their converted relations to obey Muhammed's example even while they hypocritically refused to do so themselves (such Jewish hypocrisy being a common Qur'ānic polemical motif).  The sabab thus fixes the meaning of the pronoun "ye", and also provides a gloss for the word "right conduct" (birr) as the Sunnah of Muhammed.

 Pericopal 

One theory of Qur'anic verse arrangement proposes a thematic/topical ordering of the verses (ayat).  This, combined with the Qur'an's allusive literary style (e.g. "the Qur'ānic 'they' which is frequently left ambiguous in the text") makes establishing pericopal boundaries difficult, however.  Does one verse continue the unit of meaning begun by preceding verses, or does it initiate a new one?  Sabab-material was used to both erect and pull down such boundaries, as their use with respect to verses 2:114-2:115 illustrate:

One report "suggests this verse [Q.2:115] is a continuation of Q.2:114 which concerns the destruction of mosques and thus that this verse, 115, intends that the destruction of mosques does not mean that one can no longer face a qibla".  Most sabab-material, however, locate Q.2:115 in the context of prayers not delivered in the direction of the qibla under various extenuating circumstances, thus dividing it from Q.2:114 .

 Narratological 

The function of asbāb is most straightforward at the narratological level, where the context given identifies the characters of a story, their motivations, and ambient circumstances which influence their behavior.

An extensive example of this is the sabab attributed to Ibn Ishāq (al-Wāhidī, Kitāb 22) for verses Q.2:258 and Q.2:260, detailing Ibrahim's encounter with Nimrod.  Because the sabab does not explain why the verses were revealed, only the story within it, though, this report would qualify as an instance of akhbār according to the sabab identification criteria later established by al-Suyūtī.

A much more (in-)famous example of a narratological sabab al-nuzūl is the incident of the so-called Satanic Verses.  In it, verses Q.22:52 and Q.53:19-23 are woven into a single narrative.  Muhammad, longing to be reconciled to his people, allows Satan to interpolate several verses into the recitation of Surat al-Najm (53) recognizing the efficacy of the pagan goddesses Allāt, Manāt, and al-'Uzzā.  The pagans of Mecca are so pleased by this that they immediately cease their persecution of the Muslims, to the extent that a group of Abyssinian refugees begins to return home.  Yet Muhammad is later sternly chastised by the angel Gabriel for this concession to Meccan paganism, at which point God reveals Q.22:52 to comfort him as well as the real versions of verses Q.53:19-23 in which the goddesses are belittled:

This sabab appears in Wāhidī (Kitāb, 177–178).

 Historical/ethnological 

For Muslims the definition of the jāhiliyyah scene (i.e. Arabia's pre-Islamic age of "ignorance") was an important concern, but complicated by their religion's competing claims to be both a stark break with this past as well as a continuation of practices begun by "Islam" in its pre-Qur'anic, ur-religion manifestations, as in worship at the Kaaba.

Many "ethnological" asbāb exist for this purpose, with those put forward for Q.2:158 particularly illustrative of their function at this level of interpretation:

The verse concerns the ritual practice of circumambulating between the hills of Safa and Marwa; the two asbāb cited by al-Wāhidī both describe the controversy regarding this ritual (Q.2:158's occasion of revelation) by reference to the jāhilī scene.  The first sabab states that the pagan Arabs practiced this (ur-Islamically sanctioned) ritual, but that they so adulterated it with idolatry that the first Muslims pressed to abandon it until Q.2:158 was revealed.  The second sabab provides conflicting ethnological data, stating that the practice was instituted by Muhammed in opposition to the pagans' sacrifices to their idols.

These asbāb have no legal incidence; they function merely to settle a matter of curiosity as well as to contrast the Islamic dispensation with what came before, obviously to the benefit of the former.  This imperative, plus the fact that much of the material is contradictory make such asbāb useful only for reconstructing the development of Islamic ideology and identity, rather than the pre-Islamic Arabian past.

 Legal 

Legal exegesis is the most hermeneutically complex level of interpretation for several reasons.  One is that every ruling must be considered with respect to the corpus of Islamic holy law.  If the ruling contradicts some other one, does it abrogate/mitigate its foil, or is it itself abrogated/mitigated?  Note that the foil may not always be a particular verse or pericope, but a principle synthesized from multiple rulings.  The second, even more basic, complexity resides in determining which verses have legal content.  A seemingly proscriptive verse may be made merely polemical by interpretation, while a seemingly non-proscriptive verse may have actual legal import.  Lastly there is the issue of juridical inflation/deflation (the latter termed takhsīs) where the scope/applicability of the ruling may be radically increased or decreased by exegesis.

The asbāb surrounding Q.2:115 have already shown how legal consequences may be injected into a seemingly non-hukmic verse.  The asbāb for Q.2:79 demonstrate the opposite:

Here the reports agree the verse is directed against the Jews, and so a proscription with seemingly broad applicability is almost completely deflated into a polemical filip about Jewish alteration of holy scripture (tahrīf).

Lastly, as an example of juridical inflation, is Q.2:104:

The asbāb put forward by the exegetes cannot establish the meaning of the probably-transliterated word rā'inā, but they generally identify it as some sort of curse or mock which the Jews tricked the Muslims into incorporating into their own greetings.  In any case:

As these examples amply demonstrate, supporting exegetical literature (e.g. hadith, sabab-material) are often decisive in fixing the legal meaning of a particular Qur'anic verse/pericope.  Appealing to the raw, unmediated text of the Qur'an as proof of consensus within traditional Islamic law for or against some practice is thus almost always a futile exercise.

 History of Asbab al-Nuzul works 
The earliest and the most important work in this genre is undoubtedly Kitab asbab al-Nuzul ("Book of occasions of revelation") of Ali ibn Ahmad al-Wahidi (d. 1075 CE). al-Wahidi mentions occasions of about 570 verses out of 6236 verses of the Quran. Wahidi's work is not only the first attempt to collect all the material regarding the occasions of revelation in one single volume, but it is also the standard upon which all subsequent works were based. al-Wahidi was born in the city of Nishapur and he died there at an advanced age. He was a poet, philologist, grammarian and Quranic commentator. In fact, He was considered a great commentator of the Quran of his time. His main teacher was the famous Quranic commentator al-Thalabi (d. 1036 CE) and Wahidi seems to have enjoyed the support of the Seljuq vizier Nizam al-Mulk.

Another important work is by al-Suyuti (d. 1505 CE) which is a slight improvement of al-Wahidi's book. Suyuti wrote his book about four centuries after al-Wahidi. It contains more occasions of revelation compared to Wahidi's work. His work covers 102 chapters (sura) of the Quran while Wahidi's work covers 83 suras. The name of his book is Lubab al-Nuqul fi Asbab al-Nuzul (meaning "The best of narrations concerning the circumstances of revelation").

No asbāb works from earlier than the 11th century are known, and it is unlikely that this genre of exegetical literature existed before then.  Though there is a section titled Nuzūl al-Qur'ān in Ibn al-Nadīm's 10th-century bibliographical catalog Kitāb al-Fihrist (including one Nuzūl al-Qur'ān attributed to the semi-legendary Ibn 'Abbās as transmitted through 'Ikrima), there is no evidence to believe that most of these works ever existed, or that their ambiguous titles signify texts within the asbāb al-nuzūl genre.  In Rippin's detailed examination of pre-18th-century exegetical literature, other works include as follows:

 Asbāb al-nuzūl wa qisas al-furqāniyya  by Muhammad ibn As'ad al-'Irāqī (died 1171).  Contains sabab reports mixed with qisas al-anbiyā (stories of the prophets) material. The former seem independent of al-Wāhidī's compilation and are isnad-less.  Exists in two manuscripts copies, one at the Chester Beatty Library (Manuscript 5199).
 A manuscript (Berlin Staatsbibliothek, Catalog no. 3578). ascribed to al-Ja'barī, probably pseudepigraphicaly.  Consists of sabab and naskh material interspersed, with the former containing very abbreviated isnads where only the first authority is listed.  According to its final page this manuscript was written in 1309.

Though al-Wāhidī may thus be considered the father of this genre (a view consistent with his rather self-serving depiction of asbāb al-nuzūl as the key to all exegesis), al-Suyūtī made significant contributions to it as well, introducing such refinements as limiting reports to only those contemporaneous with the revelation itself (reports related to events described by''' the verse were reclassified as akhbār) and developing a sabab selection criterion different from al-Wāhidī's rather mechanistic one of scanning for a select few "marker" introductory phrases.Sabab-material did not originate with the asbāb al-nuzūl genre.  The chief innovation of the genre was organizational (i.e. the collection of asbāb-material within one text) and to a lesser degree methodological, and so while no work prior to al-Wāhidī's Kitāb may be properly called an instance of asbāb al-nuzūl, material of equivalent function exists in the earliest hadith and tafsir.  This distinction will be maintained here by the use of the term sabab-material for an occasion of revelation which does not necessarily come from a work of asbāb al-nuzūl, and sabab only for one that does.

The reasons for asbābs status as a secondary genre are implicit in this bibliographical overview.  Its late emergence (well into the classical period) plus its reliance on earlier tafsir works even for its raw material prevented asbāb al-nuzūl''s emergence as a major, independent approach to Qur'anic interpretation.

See also 

 Tafsir
 Naskh

References

Further reading 

 
 

Asbab al-nuzul
Quranic exegesis